was a town located in Kaho District, Fukuoka Prefecture, Japan.

As of 2003, the town had an estimated population of 7,043 and a density of 424.28 persons per km². The total area was 16.60 km².

On March 26, 2006, Kaita, along with the towns of Chikuho, Honami and Shōnai (all from Kaho District), was merged into the expanded city of Iizuka.

External links
 Iizuka official website 

Dissolved municipalities of Fukuoka Prefecture
Populated places disestablished in 2006
2006 disestablishments in Japan